Walton Heath Golf Club is a golf club in England, near Walton-on-the-Hill in Surrey, southwest of London.  Founded in 1903, the club comprises two 18-hole golf courses, both of which are well known for having heather covering many of the areas of rough.

Both were designed by Herbert Fowler, who later designed numerous  courses in the United Kingdom and United States.

Walton Heath has had a long association with royalty and politics, with Edward, Prince of Wales having been the club's first captain in 1935, and former United Kingdom Prime Ministers David Lloyd George, Winston Churchill, Bonar Law and Arthur Balfour all having been members. The club has also only ever had four club professionals, including five time British Open champion James Braid who held the post from 1904 until 1950.

Both courses at Walton Heath have been consistently rated in the UK's top 100 courses, with the Old Course also being rated as one of the top 100 in the world.

Tournaments
Walton Heath has been the venue of a number of national amateur tournaments and championships. It has also hosted several high profile professional events including the 1981 Ryder Cup, when it stepped in as a replacement venue after construction at The Belfry had not been completed in time. The club also hosted five editions of the European Open, a European Tour event, between 1978 and 1991.

Since 2005, Walton Heath has been the venue for the U.S. Open European qualifying tournament. In the first year, New Zealander Michael Campbell qualified at Walton Heath, and went on to win the Open at Pinehurst.

Walton Heath hosted The Senior Open Championship, one of the five majors recognised by the Champions Tour, the world's dominant tour for golfers 50 and older, from 21–24 July 2011. The event was eventually won by Russ Cochran.

It hosted the British Masters on the European Tour in October 2018, won by Eddie Pepperell.

It is scheduled to host Women's British Open in 2023.

Scorecard
Old Course

The 2nd & 4th hole are par 5 for ladies.

New Course

The 5th & 9th hole are par 5 for ladies (except for Blue tee) .

References

External links

Golf clubs and courses in Surrey
Ryder Cup venues
1903 establishments in England
Sports venues completed in 1903